Paterson Islands is a group of small islands lying  northeast of Klung Islands,  southeast of Wiltshire Rocks and Kitney Island, and  southeast of Smith Rocks, close along the coast of Mac. Robertson Land. Mapped by Norwegian cartographers from air photos taken by the Lars Christensen Expedition, 1936–37. Named by Antarctic Names Committee of Australia (ANCA) for A.J.F. Paterson, supervisory technician (radio) at Mawson Station, 1963.

See also 
 List of Antarctic and sub-Antarctic islands

Islands of Mac. Robertson Land